Poaching is illegal hunting or fishing.

Poaching, poacher, or poach may also refer to:

Food
 Poaching (cooking)
 Lincolnshire Poacher cheese, a cheese from the United Kingdom
The Lincolnshire Poacher

Sport
 Poach (pickleball), a type of shot in the sport of pickleball
 Poaching (snowboarding), snowboarding at a resort where snowboards are explicitly prohibited.
 Poaching (tennis), when a doubles player aggressively moves across the court to volley a ball intended for their partner.
 Poacher 21, an American sailboat design
 Goal poacher, in association football

Other uses
 Poacher (film), a 2018 British-Kenyan film
 Poacher (fish), a common name for some fish species in the family Agonidae
 Mate poaching in animals, seduction of an animal who has already established a bond with another creature
 Human mate poaching, in human infidelity
 Poacher Line, a railway line in Lincolnshire, United Kingdom

See also
 Antipoaching, an anti-competitive business practice